Donal Graeme is a fictional character in the Childe Cycle of science fiction novels by Gordon R. Dickson.

Although he only appears as a major character in one of the novels, Dorsai!, he is transformed into the character Hal Mayne who is important in the later parts of the series.

"The boy is odd.  You never know which way he'll jump."  This is how Donal is described by his teachers in the military academy on the planet known to the rest of humanity as The Dorsai.  Bleak and mountainous, the Dorsai's major export is its superb mercenary officers.  Donal is the latest in a long line of such.

In his first campaigns, he displays unusual ability in leading military forces and a flair for bold tactics.  He flouts received wisdom such as "You can't conquer an inhabited planet", fashioning feints and deceptions that make his opponents believe he has found a way to do exactly that.  In another campaign, he deceives the enemy into descending onto an uninhabited planet to expel an occupying force of great strength, only to find that the ground forces were an empty threat, a diversion. Donal's main force appears in orbit, ready to bomb them unless they surrender.

Gradually, he navigates the maze of interstellar politics until, in order to frustrate a takeover by his nemesis, William of Tau Ceti, the various planets unite and appoint him Protector.  Avoiding a coup by William he makes real what was previously a deception by, in a meticulously planned campaign, taking over every facility on William's home planet.

Finally, he comes to a realization.  He is not like other soldiers, or even other humans.  He describes himself as an "intuitive superman", one who is not merely better at everything a human can do but in fact uses mental processes not available to ordinary humans, processes which defy logic and cannot be explained in linear logical terms.  He understands that he has become the nursemaid of the human race in its quest to evolve to the next level.  He settles into an existence both wonderful and lonely.

Transformation I. In the 'bookend' around 'Dorsai!', Hal Mayne receives a Final Encyclopedia entry describing allegorically Donal Graeme's spaceship accident, a phase error. This leads him to conclude that Graeme was the person who animated the body of Paul Formain during Paul's sailing accident in 'Necromancer', and thus it was Donal who guides the original breakup into the Splinter Cultures.

Transformation II.  While the universe at large believes that Donal Graeme was killed in a spaceship accident, a small spacecraft turns up in Terran space with an infant on board, and with resources to assure that the baby has a unique upbringing.  Named Hal Mayne, the baby is trained by three tutors—a Dorsai, an Exotic, and a Friendly.  Escaping from an unexpected murder attempt, the young Mayne eventually ends up in The Final Encyclopedia, where he shows a unique ability to work intuitively with the strands of human knowledge stored in the Encyclopedia's cyberspace.  It is eventually revealed that Mayne is in fact Donal Graeme, who had somehow developed the ability to reinvent himself as an infant and secure the necessary training to become the first Responsible Man, and who remains in conflict with the organization of Others led by Bleys Ahrens.

Cultural references 
In the popular 1990s computer game Star Control II, one of the melee captains for the (human) Earthling Cruiser is named "Graeme", alongside other recognizable human science fiction captain names including "Kirk", "Decker", "Adama", "Solo", and "Buck".

References

Science fiction characters
Gordon R. Dickson
Fictional mercenaries